The Southern Tagalog 10 was a group of activists abducted and "disappeared" in 1977 during martial law in the Philippines under Proclamation No. 1081 issued by President of Philippines Ferdinand E. Marcos. Of the 10 university students and professors who were abducted, only three, Virgilio Silva, Salvador Panganiban, and Modesto Sison, "surfaced" later after being killed by suspected agents of the state. Two of those who surfaced were apparently summarily executed. The rest were never found.

Background 
The victims, most of them in their early twenties, all belonged to a network of community organizations in the Southern Tagalog region, Philippines. They were abducted in late July 1977 at the Makati Medical Center in Metro Manila.

The incident is believed to be the single biggest case of involuntary disappearance during martial law. Bonifacio Ilagan, brother of one of the victims and vice chair of Samahan ng Ex-Detainees Laban sa Detensyon at Aresto (an organization that works for the welfare of political detainees), described the abduction as "the single biggest case of involuntary disappearance and summary execution perpetrated by the Armed Forces of the Philippines in the entire history of the Marcos martial law in the Philippines."

Members 
The ten individuals known as the Southern Tagalog 10 are:
Cristina Catalla
Gerardo "Gerry" Faustino
 Rizalina Ilagan
 Ramon Jasul
 Salvador Panganiban
Jessica Sales
 Emmanuel Salvacruz
 Virgilio Silva
 Modesto “Bong” Sison
 Erwin de la Torre

The names of Catalla, Faustino, Rizalina Ilagan, Jasul, Sales, and Sison are included on the Bantayog ng mga Bayani's Wall of Remembrance for martyrs and heroes of martial law.

In popular culture 
The play Pagsambang Bayan (People’s Worship), written by Bonifacio Ilagan, is dedicated to the members of the Southern Tagalog 10. It was first staged in September 1977 at the University of the Philippines (U.P.) by the U.P. Repertory Company under the direction of Behn Cervantes. Its staging led to the arrest of Cervantes and the play's musical director. The play won the Palihang Aurelio V. Tolentino and has since been performed hundreds of times. The Cultural Center of the Philippines (CCP) cites the play as a "major work in Philippine theater." A musical version of the play was staged in 2017 by director Joel Lamangan at the Polytechnic University of the Philippines and the CCP.

On television, actress Bianca Umali played Rizalina Ilagan in the GMA Network docudrama Alaala: A Martial Law Special, which first aired on September 17, 2017.

See also 
 Bantayog ng mga Bayani

References 

Southern Tagalog 10
Enforced disappearances in the Philippines
Presidency of Ferdinand Marcos
History of the Philippines (1965–1986)
Martial law under Ferdinand Marcos
Marcos martial law victims
Political repression in the Philippines
University of the Philippines Los Baños people honored at the Bantayog ng mga Bayani